Leucopogon cymbiformis is a flowering plant in the family Ericaceae and is endemic to the south-west of Western Australia. The flowers are arranged in short spikes, sometimes of only two or three flowers, with lance-shaped, leaf-like bracts, and bracteoles half as long as the sepals at the base of the spikes.

Leucopogon cymbiformis was first formally described in 1839 by Augustin Pyramus de Candolle in his Prodromus Systematis Naturalis Regni Vegetabilis from an unpublished description by Allan Cunningham. The specific epithet (cymbiformis) means "boat-shaped", referring to the leaves. 

This leucopogon grows in the Avon Wheatbelt, Esperance Plains and Jarrah Forest bioregions of south-western Western Australia.

References

cymbiformis
Ericales of Australia
Flora of Western Australia
Plants described in 1839
Taxa named by Augustin Pyramus de Candolle